Philip J Day is a British film producer, screenwriter, and showrunner.

His films have been awarded a Peabody, two Emmys, seven Emmy nominations, and twenty-one Telly Awards. His credits include Sky TV, NBC, Turner Broadcasting System, PBS, BBC TV, National Geographic Channel, Discovery, Channel Four (UK), The History Channel, Science Channel, Travel Channel, TLC and PBS.

As a TV showrunner, Day has collaborated with major production companies on series, such as Stan Lee's Lucky Man, Kindred Spirits, Blood Relatives and Love Kills for Investigation Discovery, Alaska: The Last Frontier for Discovery, and National Geographic Explorer.

Day formed his production company Edge West Productions in 2008, to develop and produce movies and TV shows for multiple broadcasters in different genres.  Since its inception, the company has produced and collaborated on over two hundred hours of television, such as Curiosity (TV Series) Volcano Time Bomb, Inside Rio Carnival, The Real Roswell, Tunnel to a Lost World, Lost Cities of the Amazon, The Skyjacker That Got Away, Great Escape: The Final Secrets, and Nasca Lines The Buried Secrets.

Family 

Philip Day is the youngest of three children and the son of Hazel Day, a notable actress and opera singer, and Brian Day, a chartered accountant. Hazel is known for performances with the York light Opera Company. Her most  performances were in Kiss Me Kate, Song of Norway, and finally Kismet.

Education 

The family moved to Zambia in Africa when Philip was eleven-years-old. While living in Zambia, Day attended the Peterhouse Boys' School in Marondera, in the neighboring country of Zimbabwe. He moved back to England to finish high school at Ackworth School in West Yorkshire. Day attended film school at Harrow College. He obtained a BA(hons) in Photography, Film, and Television.

Career 

Philip J Day  has produced over two hundred hours of television and several feature films. He is an executive producer, producer, director and writer on over three hundred network shows. 

In 2020 Day directed the six-part, crime series Dying to Be Famous, about the death of a black model, Ryan Singleton, which aired on Bounce TV. That same year, he was co-executive producer on 13 episodes of the supernatural reality show, Kindred Spirits.

In 2019, The Russian Bride, starring Corbin Bernsen and Kristina Pimenova, which Day produced, was chosen to close the Fantasporto International Film Festival, in Portugal on March 2, 2019, and was released worldwide 2019 by VMI Distribution. His previous movies The Amityville Terror (2016) and Euroclub (2018) performed well on Showtime and Netflix.

He has been working as a freelance Executive Producer and Showrunner on TV series, such as Stan Lee's Lucky Man for Sky 1, "Navy Seals: America's Secret Warriors" for History (U.S. TV network), "Polar Bear Town" for the Smithsonian Institution, Blood Relatives and Love Kills for Investigation Discovery, Alaska: The Last Frontier for Discovery and Sex Sent Me to the ER for TLC.

For three years, between 2016 and 2018, Day worked with notable comic book author Stan Lee on Stan Lee's Lucky Man. Day also worked with director Robert Rodriguez for the highly regarded BBC show Ten Minute Film School.
Day wrote and directed nearly twenty TV shows for National Geographic including a film about D. B. Cooper, a man who has eluded the FBI for over thirty years.

Many of his films explore ancient civilizations. Lost Cities of the Amazon for National Geographic investigates the tragic loss of life to indigenous Amerindians along the Amazon River from disease like influenza brought unwittingly by Spanish Conquistadors after 1492 (some experts believe up to ninety percent of the population perished in the first century of white explorers). Day also works on more scientific based series.  His documentary on ancient medicine explores the origins of plastic surgery to 3,000 years before Hollywood face-lifts.

His two-hour film about the Luxor massacre Massacre in Luxor was considered a marquee documentary for both PBS and BBC.

Day established a strong relationship with American broadcasters, such as PBS the History Channel and the Discovery Channel. Day's most notable films during this period include Hello Mr. President, which won him a prestigious Peabody Award and an Emmy Nomination. The eminent journalist Sir Charles Wheeler wrote and narrated the documentary on Lyndon B Johnson. The documentary spawned a multi-part TV series called 'The Whitehouse Tapes' History Channel. The prestigious series went on to win an Emmy Award, five Emmy Award nominations, a Royal Television Society award, and multiple other awards and nominations.

In 2000, Day created an award-winning series for TLC called Why Doctors Make Mistakes.  A year later Day produced the highly rated TV show High Stakes: Bet Your Life on Vegas which partnered the director with Emmy Award winning actor Ray Liotta. A year later Day used his Hollywood contacts to launch a major BBC/Discovery three-part series, The Hollywood Machine, (aka Hollywood, Inc.) The series examined the key reasons behind blockbuster success and dismal failure. Denzel Washington, Hugh Jackman, and Jude Law are just a few of the luminaries who appear in the series. The Times of London, described the series as "highly entertaining", The Observer wrote it was "a must for all aspirants of film".

In 2001 Day directed the International Emmy Award Nominee Challenger: Go For Launch.

In 2006 Day moved to California, where he set up his production company Edge West Productions. Between 2008 and 2018 Edge West won thirteen Telly Awards for productions like The Skyjacker That Got Away for National Geographic Channel. In 2010 Philip J. Day was nominated for an Emmy Award at the 2010 News and Documentary Emmy Awards for the film The Skyjacker That Got Away. In both 2014 & 2015 his series Alaska: The Last Frontier was nominated for a News and Documentary Emmy Award.

Held At Gunpoint 

In 2009 Day and his team had been filming in the desert of southern Peru on a film about the Nazca Lines for National Geographic Channel. At around 3:45 am five armed men, wearing face masks, scaled a twenty-foot wall to break into the hotel, where Day and his team were asleep. The assailants first took the receptionist and hotel manager hostage at gunpoint. The receptionist was bound and gagged while the manager was forced to provide a master key for all the bedrooms. The attackers had specifically come to steal expensive film equipment. They beat up several people and stole some equipment, but the actions of hotel staff saved the crew from a more severe and potentially life-threatening robbery.

Collaborations 

Philip Day has contracted many major celebrities for voiceover talent, including Stan Lee on Stan Lee's Lucky Man, Mick Jagger Passion, Pride & Penalties, Henry Rollins on Inside the Warrior Gene, Craig Ferguson in My Friend Hellman & Friday at the Dome, Lisa Ling on National Geographic's Explorer,
Alan Rickman Tango With Ninagawa,
Ray Liotta High Stakes: Bet Your Life on Vegas,
Brian Cox The Late Show,
Peter Coyote National Geographic Explorer,
Akiva Goldsman, Ridley Scott, Kathleen Kennedy Hollywood Inc.,
Morwenna Banks Signals, and
Jon Ronson The Ronson Mission.

Credits 

 "Kindred Spirits" (2021) Travel Channel
 "Dying to be Famous: The Ryan Singleton Mystery" (2020) Bounce TV
 "Lost in the Wild" (2020) Travel Channel
 "The Russian Bride" (2019) Independent Movie
 "Amanda to the Rescue" (2019) Animal Planet
 "Stan Lee's Lucky Man"(2018) Sky 1
 "San Diego: City of Adventure" (2018) National Geographic
 "Off The Map" (2018) Travel Channel
 "Inside North Korea: Then & Now" (2018) National Geographic
 "Navy Seals: America's Secret Warrriors" (2017) History
 "Love Kills" (2017) Investigation Discovery
 "The Amityville Terror" (2016) Independent Movie
 "Stan Lee's Lucky Man" (2016) Sky 1
 "Euroclub" (2016) Independent Movie
 "Outrageous Acts of Psych" (2015) Science Channel
 "Blood Relatives" (2015) Investigation Discovery
 "Polar Bear Town" (2015) Smithsonian Channel
 "Alaska: The Last Frontier" (2013) Discovery Channel
 "Party Like the Rich and Famous" (2012) National Geographic
 "Party Like the Queen of France" (2012) National Geographic
 "Party Like a Roman Emperor" (2012) National Geographic
 "Volcano Time Bomb" (2012) Discovery Channel
 "Vanished From Alcatraz" (2011) National Geographic
 "Crime Lords of Tokyo" (2011) National Geographic
 "Nasca Lines The Buried Secrets" (2010) National Geographic
 "Explorer 25 Years" (2010) National Geographic
 "Born To Rage?" (2010) National Geographic
 "Great Escape The Final Secrets" (2009) National Geographic
 "The Skyjacker That Got Away" (2009) National Geographic
 "Lost Cities of the Amazon" (2008) National Geographic
 "Tunnel to a Lost World" (2008) National Geographic
 "Inside Rio Carnaval" (2007) PBS
 "The Real Roswell" (2007) National Geographic
 "Ancient Plastic Surgery" (2005) Channel 4 (UK)/ Discovery
 "Megastructures" (2005) National Geographic
 "Mind of a Millionaire" (2003) BBC
 "Massacre in Luxor" (2002) BBC TV/ NHK
 "Hollywood Inc" (2002) TLC
 "City of the God Kings" (2002) Channel 4 (UK) / Discovery
 "High Stakes: Bet Your Life on Vegas" (2001) TLC
 "Challenger: Go For Launch" (2000) BBC TV/Discovery
 "Why Doctors Make Mistakes" (2000) Channel 4 (UK)/TLC
 "The Johnson Tapes" (1999) Channel 4 (UK)/ History Channel
 "Riddle of the Skies" (1999) Channel 4 (UK)/ Discovery
 "Passion, Pride & Penalties" (1998) BBC TV
 "Cancer Wars" (1998) Channel 4/Discovery
 "Casualty 250" (1998) BBC TV
 "Hello Mr. President" (1997) Channel 4/ History Channel

Awards 

 Telly Awards – New York, 2018 "San Diego: City of the Future"
 Primetime Emmy Nominee – New York 2015 "Alaska: The Last Frontier"
 Primetime Emmy Nominee – New York 2014 "Alaska: The Last Frontier"
 Telly Awards – New York, 2013 "Party Like The Queen of France"
 Telly Awards – New York, 2013 "Party Like A Roman Emperor"
 Telly Awards – New York, 2013 "Party Like The Rich & Famous"
 Telly Awards – New York, 2012 "Crime Lords of Tokyo"
 Telly Awards – New York, 2011 "Born to Rage"
 Telly Awards – New York, 2011 "Vanished From Alcatraz"
 News and Documentary Emmy Nominee – New York 2010 "The Skyjacker That Got Away"
 Telly Awards – New York, 2010 "The Skyjacker That Got Away"
 Telly Awards – New York, 2010 "Great Escape: The Final Secrets"
 Telly Awards – New York, 2010 "Lost Cities of the Amazon"
 Telly Awards – New York, 2010 "Tunnel To A Lost World"
 News and Documentary International Emmy Award– New York 2004 "The Johnson Tapes"
 Telly Awards – New York, 2002 "Challenger: Go For Launch"
 News and Documentary Emmy Nominee – New York 2002 "Challenger: Go For Launch"
 British Medical Association Certificate of Educational Merit, London 2000 – "Why Doctors Make Mistakes"
 News and Documentary Emmy Nominee – New York 2000 "The Johnson Tapes"
 Telly Awards – New York, 2000 "The Johnson Tapes"
 Best Historical Documentary – Grierson Award Finalist, 1998 "Hello Mr. President"
 Peabody Award Winner – New York 1998 "Hello Mr. President"
 Best Music and Arts Series – UK Indie Awards, London 1997 "Moving Pictures"

References

External links 

 
 Edge West Productions

Year of birth missing (living people)
Living people
Alumni of Peterhouse Boys' School
People educated at Ackworth School
British documentary film directors
British documentary film producers
People from Harrogate
People from Santa Monica, California